David "Davey" Jeremy Grant (born 18 December 1985) is an English mixed martial artist. He was one of the cast members for TUF 18 The Ultimate Fighter: Team Rousey vs. Team Tate, UFC TV series program, and he  competes in Bantamweight division of the Ultimate Fighting Championship.

Background 
Grant started kickboxing training when he was 14 and picked up grappling on later date where he had his first amateur fight at the age of 15. Along with training MMA, Grant also played football and rugby during his teenage years. He decided to take it seriously when he was 21 where he decided to be a professional fighter after he won a fight just to prove to his friends he had trained in MMA.

He was cast in the TUF 18 The Ultimate Fighter: Team Rousey vs. Team Tate, UFC TV series program aired on BT Sport in the UK in 2013. He made it to the final for TUF 18 and despite the loss to Chris Holdsworth, he was signed by UFC.

Mixed martial arts career

Early career
Grant fought all his fights primary in England circuit and amassed of a record of 9–1 prior signed by UFC.

The Ultimate Fighter 18
Grant was selected as one of the cast members for The Ultimate Fighter: Team Rousey vs. Team Tate, under Team Ronda Rousey in September 2013.

In the preliminary bout preceding the tournament, Grant faced Danny Martinez whom he defeated via second-round submission. In the elimination round, Grant submitted Louis Fisette in the second round. Grant was next scheduled to face Anthony Gutierrez. However, Gutierrez did not make weight and was expelled from the show and Grant advanced to the Final facing Chris Holdsworth in The Ultimate Fighter 18 Finale.

Ultimate Fighting Championship

Grant made his UFC debut on November 30, 2013 at The Ultimate Fighter 18 Finale in Las Vegas, United States against Chris Holdsworth to crown the bantamweight winner of The Ultimate Fighter 18. He lost by rear-naked choke in round two.

Grant was expected to face Roland Delorme at UFC Fight Night: Gustafsson vs. Manuwa and it was cancelled after the weigh ins the day before the event due to Grant suffering a torn meniscus. He voiced his disappointment for not being able to make the fight in front of his home crowd in an interview:

After a 25-month hiatus from competing, after his UFC debut, due to separate injuries to his knees, ankle and back, on February 27, 2016, Grant took up Marlon Vera at UFC Fight Night: Silva vs. Bisping. He won the fight via unanimous decision with a score of 30–26, across the board.

On October 8, 2016, Grant faced Damian Stasiak at UFC 204. He was submitted via an armbar and lost the fight. Grant and Stasiak felt the cracked of Grant's arm twice during the submission, and Grant said in his post-fight interview:

After an 18-month hiatus, Grant was scheduled to meet Manny Bermudez on May 27, 2018 at UFC Fight Night 130. However, Grant pulled out of the fight after being diagnosed with a staph infection, and the bout was scrapped. The pairing was left intact and took place on July 22, 2018 at UFC Fight Night 134. After being knocked down early, he lost the fight via a triangle choke.

Grant faced Grigory Popov on November 9, 2019 at UFC on ESPN+ 21. He won the fight via a split decision.

Grant was expected to face Louis Smolka on March 28, 2020 at UFC on ESPN: Ngannou vs. Rozenstruik. Due to the COVID-19 pandemic, the event was eventually postponed.

Grant faced Martin Day on July 11, 2020 at UFC 251. He won the fight via knockout in the third round. This win earned him the Performance of the Night award.

Grant faced Jonathan Martinez on March 13, 2021 at UFC Fight Night 187. He won the fight via knockout in round two. This win earned him the Performance of the Night award.

A rematch with Marlon Vera took place on June 19, 2021 at UFC on ESPN 25. He lost the bout via unanimous decision. The bout earned both fighters the Fight of the Night award.

Grant faced Adrian Yanez on November 20, 2021 at UFC Fight Night 198. He lost the bout via split decision. 12 out of 12 media scores gave it to Yanez. The bout earned both fighters the Fight of the Night award.

Grant faced Louis Smolka on May 14, 2022 at UFC on ESPN 36. After knocking Smolka down multiple times via punches and leg kicks, Grant won the bout via KO in round three.

Grant faced Raphael Assunção, replacing Kyler Phillips, on March 11, 2023 at UFC Fight Night 221. He won the fight via a reverse triangle choke technical submission in the third round. This win earned him the Performance of the Night award.

Personal life
Grant and his wife Sherrie have two sons and a daughter.

Championships and accomplishments

Mixed martial arts
Ultimate Fighting Championship
Performance of the Night (three times) 
Fight of the Night (two times)

Mixed martial arts record

|-
|Win
|align=center|15–6
|Raphael Assunção
|Technical Submission (reverse triangle choke)
|UFC Fight Night: Yan vs. Dvalishvili
|
|align=center|3
|align=center|4:43
|Las Vegas, Nevada, United States
|
|-
|Win
|align=center|14–6
|Louis Smolka 
|KO (punches)
|UFC on ESPN: Błachowicz vs. Rakić 
| 
|align=center|3
|align=center|0:49
|Las Vegas, Nevada, United States
|
|-
|Loss
|align=center|13–6
|Adrian Yanez
|Decision (split)
|UFC Fight Night: Vieira vs. Tate
|
|align=center|3
|align=center|5:00
|Las Vegas, Nevada, United States
|
|-
|Loss
|align=center|13–5
|Marlon Vera
|Decision (unanimous)
|UFC on ESPN: The Korean Zombie vs. Ige 
|
|align=center|3
|align=center|5:00
|Las Vegas, Nevada, United States
|
|-
|Win
|align=center|13–4
|Jonathan Martinez
|KO (punch)
|UFC Fight Night: Edwards vs. Muhammad
|
|align=center|2
|align=center|3:03
|Las Vegas, Nevada, United States
|
|-
|Win
|align=center|12–4
|Martin Day
|KO (punch)
|UFC 251 
|
|align=center|3
|align=center|2:38
|Abu Dhabi, United Arab Emirates
|
|-
| Win
|align=center|11–4
|Grigorii Popov
|Decision (split)
|UFC Fight Night: Magomedsharipov vs. Kattar 
|
|align=center|3
|align=center|5:00
|Moscow, Russia
|
|-
| Loss
| align=center|10–4
|Manny Bermudez
| Technical Submission (triangle choke)
| UFC Fight Night: Shogun vs. Smith
| 
| align=center| 1
| align=center| 0:59
| Hamburg, Germany
|
|-
| Loss
| align=center| 10–3
| Damian Stasiak
| Submission (armbar)
| UFC 204
| 
| align=center| 3
| align=center| 3:56
| Manchester, England
|
|-
| Win
| align=center| 10–2
| Marlon Vera
| Decision (unanimous)
| UFC Fight Night: Silva vs. Bisping
| 
| align=center| 3
| align=center| 5:00
| London, England
|
|-
| Loss
| align=center| 9–2
| Chris Holdsworth
| Submission (rear-naked choke)
| The Ultimate Fighter: Team Rousey vs. Team Tate Finale
| 
| align=center| 2
| align=center| 2:10
| Las Vegas, Nevada, United States
|
|-
| Win
| align=center| 9–1
| Danny Welsh
| Submission (rear-naked choke)
| M4tC 7
| 
| align=center| 1
| align=center| 1:54
| Sunderland, England
|
|-
| Win
| align=center| 8–1
| James Pennington
| Submission (guillotine choke)
| Shock n' Awe 11
| 
| align=center| 1
| align=center| 3:59
| Portsmouth, England
|
|-
| Win
| align=center| 7–1
| Rob Bunford
| TKO (punches)
| Total Combat 46
| 
| align=center| 1
| align=center| 1:01
| Spennymoor, England
|
|-
| Win
| align=center| 6–1
| Luke Dixon
| Submission (rear-naked choke)
| Total Combat 44
| 
| align=center| 1
| align=center| 2:11
| Sunderland, England
|
|-
| Win
| align=center| 5–1
| Mark Aldridge
| Submission (rear-naked choke)
| Total Combat 41
| 
| align=center| 1
| align=center| 1:12
| Sunderland, England
|
|-
| Win
| align=center| 4–1
| Declan Williams
| Submission (rear-naked choke)
| Total Combat 39
| 
| align=center| 2
| align=center| 1:13
| Spennymoor, England
|
|-
| Win
| align=center| 3–1
| Mark Platts
| Submission (guillotine choke)
| Total Combat 37
| 
| align=center| 2
| align=center| 2:27
| Sunderland, England
|
|-
| Win
| align=center| 2–1
| Nathan Thompson
| Submission (guillotine choke)
| Total Combat 37
| 
| align=center| 1
| align=center| 1:17
| Sunderland, England
|
|-
| Loss
| align=center| 1–1
| Dale Dargan
| Submission (armbar)
| Total Combat 30
| 
| align=center| 1
| align=center| 3:53
| Sunderland, England
|
|-
| Win
| align=center| 1–0
| Gary Conlon
| Submission (triangle choke)
| Goshin Ryu 27
| 
| align=center| 1
| align=center| 1:00
| England
|
|-

See also
 List of current UFC fighters
 List of male mixed martial artists

References

External links
 
 

Living people
1985 births
English male mixed martial artists
Bantamweight mixed martial artists
Mixed martial artists utilizing Brazilian jiu-jitsu
Sportspeople from Bishop Auckland
Ultimate Fighting Championship male fighters
English practitioners of Brazilian jiu-jitsu